Flumethrin is a pyrethroid insecticide.  It is used externally in veterinary medicine against parasitic insects and ticks on cattle, sheep, goats, horses, and dogs, and the treatment of parasitic mites in honeybee colonies.

Chemistry
Flumethrin is a complex mixture of stereoisomers. The molecule contains three asymmetric carbon atoms, there is cis-trans isomerism at the cyclopropane ring, and cis-trans isomerism at the carbon-carbon double bond of the alkene. So there are 16 different isomers. Commercial flumethrin typically contains 92% of the trans isomers on the cyclopropane ring and the cis-configuration at the olefinic carbon-carbon double bond and 8% of the isomer with cis geometry on the cyclopropane ring and the cis-configuration at the olefinic carbon-carbon double bond.

Uses
Flumethrin is used in products, such as flea and tick collars, to protect pets against fleas.

It is also used in the proprietary product, ″Bayvarol″, ″Polyvar Yellow″ which are veterinary treatments used by beekeepers against the parasitic mite Varroa destructor.

References

(cyano-(3-phenoxyphenyl)methyl) 2,2,3-trimethylcyclopropane-1-carboxylates
Veterinary drugs
Chloroarenes
Fluoroarenes